The Double Distress: A Tragedy is a 1701 play by the English writer Mary Pix. Despite its title, it is a comedy.

Plot 
The play takes place amidst conflict between the Persians and the Medes. Leamira is the daughter of the Persian king, Darius. Her father commands her to marry Tygranes (Prince of the Medes), but she loves the Persian general Cleomedon.

At the end of the play, it is revealed that Cleomedon is actually the son of Astiages, King of the Medes. Leamira and Cleomedon are therefore free to marry.

Original cast 
The original Lincoln's Inn Fields cast included John Bowman as Darius, Barton Booth as Cleomeden, John Verbruggen as Cyraxes, Benjamin Husband as Tyranges, Elizabeth Barry as Leamires and Anne Bracegirdle as Cytheria.

References

Bibliography
 Burling, William J. A Checklist of New Plays and Entertainments on the London Stage, 1700-1737. Fairleigh Dickinson Univ Press, 1992.
 Lowerre, Kathryn. Music and Musicians on the London Stage, 1695-1705. Routledge, 2017.
 Nicoll, Allardyce. History of English Drama, 1660-1900, Volume 2. Cambridge University Press, 2009.

1701 plays
Plays by Mary Pix
West End plays
Tragedy plays